Primero de Mayo is a south eastern department of Chaco Province in Argentina.

The provincial subdivision has a population of about 9,000 inhabitants in an area of  1,864 km2, and its capital city is Margarita Belén, which is located around 1,035 km from the Capital federal.

Settlements 
Colonia Benítez
Margarita Belén
Barrio San Pedro Pescador

References

External links
Massacre of Margarita Belén (Spanish)

Departments of Chaco Province